Gabrio Castrichella (born October 24, 1972) is an Italian retired professional tennis player who won a gold medal at the 1997 Mediterranean Games.

ATP Challenger Tour finals

Doubles: 1 (1 title)

References

External links

Italian male tennis players
Mediterranean Games gold medalists for Italy
Competitors at the 1997 Mediterranean Games
Mediterranean Games medalists in tennis
Living people
1972 births
20th-century Italian people